George Foreman's KO Boxing is a boxing video game produced by Acclaim, featuring boxer George Foreman, released in 1992. Three years later, Acclaim released another game featuring Foreman, Foreman For Real.

Summary
The 16-bit versions of KO Boxing were developed by Beam Software for the Mega Drive/Genesis and the Super NES in 1992. Beam Software also developed versions for the original NES and Game Boy. The game was also later available on the 8-bit Master System and the Game Gear. These two versions differ greatly from the other releases and were based on the Master System version of James Buster Douglas Knockout Boxing.

In the 16-bit and Nintendo 8-bit versions, the player assumes the role of George Foreman, who, at 43 years old, is pursuing a quest to become the undisputed heavyweight champion of the world by uniting the title belts of three fictional boxing circuits. Gameplay is almost identical to Beam's previous boxing game, Power Punch II: players are given the option to block the opponent's attempted punches, evade in two different directions, and throwing a wide variety of punches. Victory in a match can be won by knockout, technical knockout or by decision. A knockout requires a boxer to knock his opponent down four times in a three-round match; on the fourth knockdown, the downed boxer will fail to answer the 10-count. A technical knockout is awarded if a boxer is knocked down three times in a single round. If neither of these occur by the end of the third and final round, one boxer is declared the winner by a judge's decision, which is determined by each boxer's punches thrown and landed, knockdowns and total damage done.

In the 16-bit versions, a portrait of each boxer accompanies their energy meters. These portraits become progressively battered and bloody as the fighters take damage. A password system is used in career mode to save progress in the game in lieu of battery backup.

Reception

The game was poorly received. Mega said that "the dire gameplay and abysmal graphics make this a game to avoid." Total! reviewer James Beaven went as so far to call it "worse than wrestling games," panning its "jerky" animation and overwhelming difficulty: "the only reason this scored anything was because you can move George a bit." Super Gamer magazine gave the game a review score of 46% stating "George looks the business in the ring restrained beat-'em-up, but not enough moves." Super Play gave an overall score of 18%, they criticized the gameplay saying there is little opportunity to dodge the opponent's punches and the limited movement from the main character, they also gave criticism to the graphics calling it annoying and ropy concluding: "Useless boxing game that’s a strong contender for the worst SNES release of all time." Nintendo Game Zone reviewed the SNES version and gave a score of 60%, they criticized the game's graphics being poor, the inability to move in the ring, lack luster gameplay and the lack of different moves concluding: "Fun, Laughter, and great games play.  All these things aren’t to be found in George Foreman's KO Boxing."

Notes and references

Video games based on real people
Cultural depictions of boxers
Cultural depictions of American men
Boxing video games
Game Boy games
Game Gear games
Sega Genesis games
Master System games
Nintendo Entertainment System games
Super Nintendo Entertainment System games
Video games set in the 1990s
SIMS Co., Ltd. games
Sega video games
Multiplayer and single-player video games
Video games developed in Australia
Black people in art